Shades of God is the third album by British metal band Paradise Lost, released in 1992. It retains the heavy instrumentation and growled vocals characteristic of the band's previous death-doom efforts, and also shows the beginning of the band's transition to a more melodic, gothic metal sound heard on the follow-up album Icon.

Track listing
All songs written by Nick Holmes and Greg Mackintosh.

Personnel
 Nick Holmes – vocals
 Matthew Archer – drums
 Stephen Edmondson – bass
 Aaron Aedy – guitars
 Gregor Mackintosh – guitars

Guest musicians
 Sarah Marrion – vocals
 Robert John Godfrey – keyboards

Production
 George Chin – photography
 Dave McKean – cover art, design, illustrations
 Simon Efemey – engineering, producer, mixing

Charts

References

Paradise Lost (band) albums
1992 albums
Albums with cover art by Dave McKean
Music for Nations albums